Louis VIII may refer to:

 Louis VIII of France "the Lion" (1187–1226)
 Louis VIII, Duke of Bavaria (c. 1368-1447)
 Louis VIII, Duke of Bavaria "the Younger" (1403–1445)
 Louis VIII, Landgrave of Hesse-Darmstadt (1691 - 1768), (ruled 1739–1768)